Maricopa Village is a populated place situated in Maricopa County, Arizona, United States.

References

Populated places in Maricopa County, Arizona